Goshen Township is one of the fourteen townships of Clermont County, Ohio, United States. As of the 2010 census the population was 15,505.

Geography
Located in the northern part of the county, it borders the following townships:
Harlan Township, Warren County - northeast
Wayne Township - east
Stonelick Township - south
Miami Township - west
Hamilton Township, Warren County - northwest

No municipalities are located in Goshen Township, although the unincorporated community of Goshen lies in the township's center.

Name and history
It is one of seven Goshen Townships statewide. 

On July 6, 2022 Goshen Township and some surrounding areas were devastated by a EF-2 tornado this tornado went through what would be considered the heart of Goshen Township striking the main fire station, the police department, & the township office building. The Township office building also serves as the communities tornado shelter. The main fire station suffered severe damage with partial collapse of the building. The tornado continued on south southeast track through Goshen township destroying several homes and causing damage to all of the school buildings located on the Goshen local school district grounds

Government
The township is governed by a three-member board of trustees, who are elected in November of odd-numbered years to a four-year term beginning on the following January 1. Two are elected in the year after the presidential election and one is elected in the year before it. There is also an elected township fiscal officer, who serves a four-year term beginning on April 1 of the year after the election, which is held in November of the year before the presidential election. Vacancies in the fiscal officership or on the board of trustees are filled by the remaining trustees.

References

External links
Township website
County website 

Townships in Clermont County, Ohio
Townships in Ohio